Dorcadion ljubetense is a species of beetle in the family Cerambycidae. It was described by Pic in 1909. It is known from Macedonia.

Subspecies
 Dorcadion ljubetense ljubetense Pic, 1909
 Dorcadion ljubetense peristeriense Breuning, 1962

References

ljubetense
Beetles described in 1909